James Henry is a British comedy screenwriter, best known for his work on Green Wing, Campus and co-writing ITV's The Delivery Man.

Career
He began his career writing for children's television program Bob the Builder, and would contribute to several other series, such as Shaun the Sheep and Dr. Panda. He also wrote on sketch shows like Smack the Pony. He is currently developing two projects. Hero Trip is a huge-budget superhero/road trip comedy, being developed by the UK Film Council. Henry is also developing a teen drama series set in Cornwall for the BBC.

He co-hosts a screenwriting podcast with Matthew Graham, Script Rambles, where the two walk and talk about the UK film and TV industry. He has lectured on television at Falmouth University.

Filmography

References

External links
James Henry in BBC Comedy Guide
Green Wing "microsite" at Channel4.com
British Sitcom Guide  Green Wing writers.

James Henry's Blog

21st-century British screenwriters
21st-century British male writers
British television writers
British male screenwriters
British comedy writers
Living people
Year of birth missing (living people)